Straus v. American Publishers Association, 231 U.S. 222 (1913), was a United States Supreme Court case in which the Court held an agreement that is manifestly anti-competitive and illegal under the Sherman Antitrust Act cannot be justified by copyright.

References

External links
 

1913 in United States case law
United States copyright case law
United States Supreme Court cases
United States Supreme Court cases of the White Court